Dame Kathleen Mary Kenyon,  (5 January 1906 – 24 August 1978) was a British archaeologist of Neolithic culture in the Fertile Crescent. She led excavations of Tell es-Sultan, the site of ancient Jericho, from 1952 to 1958, and has been called one of the most influential archaeologists of the 20th century. She was Principal of St Hugh's College, Oxford, from 1962 to 1973, having undertaken her own studies at Somerville College, Oxford.

Biography
Kathleen Kenyon was born in London, England, in 1906. She was the eldest daughter of Sir Frederic Kenyon, biblical scholar and later director of the British Museum. Her grandfather was lawyer and Fellow of All Souls College, John Robert Kenyon, and her great-great-grandfather was the politician and lawyer Lloyd Kenyon, 1st Baron Kenyon. She grew up in Bloomsbury, London, in a house attached to the British Museum, with her mother, Amy Kenyon, and sister Nora Kenyon. Known for being hard-headed and stubborn, Kathleen grew up as a tomboy, fishing, climbing trees and playing a variety of sports.

Determined that she and her sister should be well educated, Kathleen's father encouraged wide reading and independent study. In later years Kenyon would remark that her father's position at the British Museum was particularly helpful for her education. Kathleen was an excellent student, winning awards at school and particularly excelling in history. She studied first at St Paul's Girls' School, where she was Head Girl, before winning an Exhibition to read history at Somerville College, Oxford. While at Oxford, Kenyon won a Blue for her college in hockey and became the first female president of the Oxford University Archaeological Society. She graduated in 1929 and began a career in archaeology.

Although working on several important sites across Europe, it was her excavations in Tell es-Sultan (Jericho) in the 1950s that established her as one of the foremost archaeologists in the field. In 1962, Kenyon was made Principal of St Hugh's College, Oxford. She retired in 1973 to Erbistock and was appointed a DBE. Kenyon never married. From 1974, Kenyon was the Honorary Vice President of the Chester Archaeological Society.

Archaeological career
A career in archaeology was first suggested to Kathleen by Margery Fry, librarian at Somerville College. After graduation Kenyon's first field experience was as a photographer for the pioneering excavations at Great Zimbabwe in 1929, led by Gertrude Caton-Thompson. Returning to England, Kenyon joined the archaeological couple Tessa Wheeler and her husband Mortimer Wheeler on their excavation of the Romano-British settlement of Verulamium (St Albans), 20 miles North of London. Working there each summer between 1930 and 1935, Kenyon learned from Mortimer Wheeler the discipline of meticulously controlled and recorded stratigraphic excavation. Wheeler entrusted her with the direction of the excavation of the Roman theatre.

In the years 1931 to 1934, Kenyon worked simultaneously at Samaria, then under the administration of the British Mandate for Palestine, with John and Grace Crowfoot. There she cut a stratigraphic trench across the summit of the mound and down the Northern and Southern slopes, exposing the Iron II to the Roman period stratigraphic sequence of the site. In addition to providing crucial dating material for the Iron Age stratigraphy of Palestine, she obtained key stratified data for the study of Eastern terra sigilata ware.

In 1934, Kenyon was closely associated with the Wheelers in the foundation of the Institute of Archaeology of University College London. From 1936 to 1939, she carried out important excavations at the Jewry Wall in the city of Leicester. These were published in the Illustrated London News1937 with pioneering reconstruction drawings by the artist Alan Sorrell whom she had happened to notice sketching her dig.

Digging Jericho
During the Second World War, Kenyon served as Divisional Commander of the Red Cross in Hammersmith, London, and later as acting director and Secretary of the Institute of Archaeology of the University of London.

After the war, she excavated in Southwark, at The Wrekin, Shropshire and elsewhere in Britain, as well as at Sabratha, a Roman city in Libya. As a member of the Council of the British School of Archaeology in Jerusalem (BSAJ), Kenyon was involved in the efforts to reopen the School after the hiatus of the Second World War. In January 1951 she travelled to the Transjordan and undertook excavations in the West Bank at Jericho (Tell es-Sultan) on behalf of the BSAJ. The initial findings were first viewed by the public in the Dome of Discovery at the Festival of Britain 1951 with a reconstruction drawing by Alan Sorrell. Her work at Jericho, from 1952 until 1958, made her world-famous and established a lasting legacy in the archaeological methodology of the Levant. Ground-breaking discoveries concerning the Neolithic cultures of the Levant were made in this ancient settlement. Her excavation of the Early Bronze Age walled city and the external cemeteries of the end of the Early Bronze Age, together with her analysis of the stratified pottery of these periods established her as the leading authority on that period. Kenyon focused her attention on the absence of certain Cypriot pottery at City IV, arguing for an older destruction date than that of her predecessors. Jericho was recognized as the oldest continuously occupied settlement in history because of her discoveries. At the same time she also completed the publication of the excavations at Samaria. Her volume, Samaria Sebaste III: The Objects, appeared in 1957. Having completed her excavations at Tell es-Sultan in 1958, Kenyon excavated in Jerusalem from 1961 to 1967, concentrating on the 'City of David' to the immediate south of the Temple Mount.

Although Kenyon had no doubt the sites she excavated were linked to the Old Testament narrative, she nevertheless drew attention to inconsistencies, concluding that Solomon's "stables" at Megiddo were totally impractical for holding horses (1978:72), and that Jericho fell long before Joshua's arrival (1978:35). Consequently, Kenyon's work has been cited to support the Minimalist School of Biblical Archaeology.

Legacy

Kenyon's legacy in the field of excavation technique and ceramic methodology is attested to by Larry G. Herr, one of the directors of the Madaba Plains Project. He attributes to her directly the first of the key events (after the advances made by William F. Albright at Tell Beit Mirsim in the 1920s) that brought about our modern understanding of pottery in the southern Levant:

"The first event was the refinement of stratigraphic techniques that Kathleen Kenyon's dig at Jericho catalyzed. The strict separation of earth layers, or archaeological sediments, also allowed the strict separation of ceramic assemblages".

Herr detects Kenyon's powerful indirect influence in the second event that promoted advance within ceramic methodology, namely:

"the importation of Kenyon's digging techniques by Larry Toombs and Joe Callaway to Ernest Wright's project at Balata. Here, they combined Wright's interest in ceramic typology in the best Albright tradition with Kenyon's methods of excavation, which allowed the isolation of clear, stratigraphically determined pottery assemblages".

Herr summarises the somewhat mixed nature of Kenyon's legacy: for all the positive advances, there were also shortcomings:

"Kenyon... did not capitalize fully on (the) implication of her stratigraphic techniques by producing final publications promptly. Indeed her method of digging, which most of us have subsequently adopted, causes a proliferation of loci that excavators often have difficulty keeping straight long enough to produce coherent published stratigraphic syntheses. Moreover, her insistence that excavation proceed in narrow trenches denies us, when we use the Jericho reports, the confidence that her loci, and the pottery assemblages that go with them, represent understandable human activity patterns over coherently connected living areas. The individual layers, insufficiently exposed horizontally, simply cannot be interpreted credibly in terms of function. This further makes publication difficult, both to produce and to use".

From 1948 to 1962, she lectured in Levantine Archaeology at the Institute of Archaeology, University College London. Kenyon's teaching complemented her excavations at Jericho Jericho and Jerusalem. In 1962, she was appointed Principal of St Hugh's College, Oxford.

Awards and commemoration
In the 1973 New Year Honours, following her retirement from Oxford, she was appointed a Dame Commander of the Order of the British Empire (DBE) "for services to archaeology". She was an elected Fellow of the British Academy (FBA) and of the Society of Antiquaries of London (FSA). She was made a Grand Officer of the Order of Independence by the King of Jordan in 1977.

The British School of Archaeology in Jerusalem, amalgamated within the Council for British Research in the Levant (CBRL) in 1998, was officially renamed the Kenyon Institute on 10 July 2003 in honour of Kathleen Kenyon.

Kenyon Collection 
The Kathleen Kenyon Archaeology Collection, a collection of Kenyon's books and papers purchased from her estate in 1984, is housed at Baylor University in Waco, Texas.

The finds from her excavations are held in a number of collections, including the British Museum, the UCL Institute of Archaeology, while the bulk of archive material is located at the Manchester Museum.

Published works
1942 The Buildings at Samaria, [Samaria-Sebaste I], London, 1942 (co-authored with Crowfoot, J.W. & Sukenik, E.L.)
1948 Excavations at the Jewry Wall Site, [Reports of the Research Committee of the Society of Antiquaries of London 15], Leicester, London : Society of Antiquaries, 1948.
1949 Guide to Wroxeter Roman City, London, 1949.
1951 "Some Notes on the History of Jericho in the Second Millennium B.C.", PEQ 83 (1951), 101–138.
1952 Beginning in Archaeology, London, 1952.
1952 "Early Jericho", Antiquity 26 (1952), 116–122.
1953 Beginning in Archaeology, second edition, London, 1953.
1954 Guide to Ancient Jericho, Jerusalem, 1954.
1957 Digging Up Jericho, London, 1957. (also published in Dutch, Hebrew, Italian, Spanish and Swedish editions).
1957 The Objects from Samaria, [Samaria-Sebaste III], London, 1957 (co-authored with Crowfoot, J.W. & Crowfoot, G.M.
1958 "Some Notes on the Early and Middle Bronze Age Strata of Megiddo", Eretz Israel 5 (1958), pp. 51–60.
1959 Excavations at Southwark, [Research Papers of Surrey Archaeological Society 5], 1959.
1960 Archaeology in the Holy Land, first edition, London, 1960.
1960 Excavations at Jericho – Volume I Tombs Excavated in 1952–4, London 1960.
1961 Beginning in Archaeology, revised edition, London, 1961.
1965 Archaeology in the Holy Land, second edition, London, 1965.
1965 Excavations at Jericho – Volume II Tombs Excavated in 1955–8, London, 1965.
1965, "British Archaeology Abroad – Jerusalem", Antiquity 39 (1965), 36–37.
1966 Amorites and Canaanites, (Schweich Lectures Series, 1963), London : Published for the British Academy by Oxford University Press, 1966.
1966 "Excavations in Jerusalem, 1965", PEQ (1966), 73–88.
1967 Jerusalem – Excavating 3000 Years of History, [New Aspects of Antiquity], London, 1967 (also published in a German edition).
1969 "Middle and Late Bronze Age Strata at Megiddo", Levant 1 (1969), pp. 25–60.
1970 Archaeology in the Holy Land, third edition, 1970 (also published in Dutch, Danish, German, Spanish and Swedish editions).
1971 Royal Cities of the Old Testament, London, 1971.
1971 "An Essay on Archaeological Technique: the Publication of Results from the Excavation of a Tell", Harvard Theological Review 64 (1971), 271–279.
1974 Digging up Jerusalem, London : Benn, 1974.
1974 "Tombs of the Intermediate Early Bronze – Middle Bronze Age at Tel 'Ajjul", in Stewart, J.R. (ed.), Tell el Ajjul – the Middle Bronze Age Remains, [App. 2. Studies in Mediterranean Archaeology], Göteborg, 1974, 76–85.
1978 The Bible and recent archaeology, London : British Museum Publications Ltd, 1978.

See also
 Archaeology of Israel
 Kursi, Sea of Galilee
 Plastered human skulls
 Pre-Pottery Neolithic A

References

Further reading
Callaway, Joseph A. (1979), "Dame Kathleen Kenyon, 1906 -1978", The Biblical Archaeologist 42.2 (1979), pp. 122–125.
Davis, Miriam (2008), Dame Kathleen Kenyon: Digging Up the Holy Land, Walnut Creek (CA), Left Coast Press, 304 pp.
Dever, William G. (1978), "Kathleen Kenyon (1906–1978): A Tribute", BASOR 232 (1978), pp. 3–4.
Herr, Larry G. (2002), "W.F. Albright and the History of Pottery in Palestine", NEA 65.1 (2002), pp. 51–55.
Kenrick, Philip M. (1986), Excavations at Sabratha, 1948–1951: a Report on the Excavations conducted by Kathleen Kenyon and John Ward-Perkins, (Journal of Roman Studies Monographs 2), London: Society for the Promotion of Roman Studies, 1986.
Lönnqvist, Minna (2008) "Kathleen M. Kenyon 1906–1978, A hundred years after her birth,The formative years of a female archaeologist: From socio-politics to the stratigraphical method and the radiocarbon revolution in archaeology," in Proceedings of the 5th International Congress on the Archaeology of the Ancient Near East, Madrid, 3–8 April 2006, ed. by Joaquín Mª Córdoba, Miquel Molist, Mª Carmen Pérez, Isabel Rubio, Sergio Martínez, UAM Ediciones: Madrid 2008, Vol. II, pp. 379–414.
Moorey, P. Roger S. and Parr, Peter (eds) (1978), Archaeology in the Levant – Essays for Kathleen Kenyon, Aris & Phillips, 1978.
Steiner, Margreet L. (2001), Excavations by Kathleen M. Kenyon in Jerusalem 1961–1967, Volume III—The Settlement in the Bronze and Iron Ages, London: Sheffield Academic Press, 2001.

 

 
 

1906 births
1978 deaths
British archaeologists
British women archaeologists
Biblical archaeologists
Alumni of Somerville College, Oxford
Fellows of St Hugh's College, Oxford
Dames Commander of the Order of the British Empire
People educated at St Paul's Girls' School
People associated with the UCL Institute of Archaeology
Principals of St Hugh's College, Oxford
Fellows of the British Academy
20th-century British women scientists
20th-century British women writers
20th-century archaeologists
Ancient Jericho